The 2007 Italy rugby union tour of South America was a series of matches played in June 2007 in South America by Italy national rugby union team.

Results

2007 rugby union tours
tour
2007
2007 in Argentine rugby union
Rugby union tours of Argentina
2007 in Uruguayan sport
2007